Wellheim is a municipality  in the district of Eichstätt in Bavaria in Germany. It lies in the so-called "Urdonautal", the valley the Danube used some 300,000 years ago on its way to the Black Sea. Today a little river, the Schutter flows through the village in the opposite direction (north-south vs. south-north). The community consists of 5 villages (Aicha, Hard, Gammersfeld, Biesenhard, Konstein and Wellheim) and has about 2800 inhabitants. Today there is no industry at all but a wonderful landscape with a pure nature.

See also
 Wellheim Castle

References

Eichstätt (district)